Nick Jr. is a German TV television channel broadcasting to children in Germany, Switzerland and Austria. The current version of channel was launched on September 12, 2005 as a programming block on the relaunched version of Nickelodeon between 6am and 10am and 4:30am to 9:45am on Nick Premium. The channel now broadcasts 24/7 from March 31, 2009. Before the channel launched, some programs were broadcast on Super RTL and Disney Channel.

On 1 April 2020, Nick Jr. and Nicktoons were added to Sky Deutschland, replacing Disney Junior.

The channel also had a block on the original version of Nickelodeon Germany which lasted until 29 May 1998 between 9:30am and 11:30am, the German-input block was presented by Face (known in German as Gesicht), although the block was initially titled Nickelodeon Circus. On 31 March 2010, the channel rebranded into its current look.

Nick Jr. von Nickelodeon
On 4 February 2019, the Nick Jr. block was removed from Nickelodeon Germany. However, Nick Jr. von Nickelodeon continued to air on Nick Schweiz and Austria until October 2021.

Current programs
 Abby Hatcher
 Blaze and the Monster Machines (Blaze und die Monster Maschinen)
 Baby Shark's Big Show! (Baby Sharks Große Show!)
 Blue's Clues & You!
 Bubble Guppies
 Butterbean's Cafe
 Deer Squad (Die Waldtruppe)
 Dora and Friends: Into the City! (Dora & Friends)
 Dora the Explorer (Dora)
 Dougie in Disguise
 Hey Duggee
 Miffy's Adventures Big and Small (Miffys Abenteuer groß und klein)
 PAW Patrol
 Peppa Pig (Peppa Wutz)
 Rusty Rivets
 Santiago of the Seas (Santiago auf hoher See)
 Shimmer and Shine
 Top Wing

Former programs
 The Backyardigans
 Tee and Mo
 Team Umizoomi (Umizoomi)
 Miss Spider's Sunny Patch Friends
 Allegra's Window
 Wonder Pets
 Fireman Sam
 Nella the Princess Knight
 GoGoRiki
 Tickety Toc
 The Fresh Beat Band
 Teletubbies
 LazyTown
 Garfield and Friends (Garfield und Seine Freunde)
 Go, Diego, Go!
 Blue's Clues (Blue's Clues - Blau Und Schlau)
 Jack's Big Music Show
 Sunny Day
 Agib Al Saghir
 Ni Hao, Kai-Lan
 The Smurfs (Die Schlumpfe)
 Dragon Tales
 Pinky Dinky Doo
 SpongeBob SquarePants (SpongeBob Schwammkopf, only aired on occasions)
 Boo!
 Max & Ruby (Max und Ruby)
 Wimzie's House (Was ist denn heut bei Wimzie los)

See also
 Nickelodeon (Germany)
 Super RTL
 MTV Germany
 Nicktoons (Germany)
 Nick Schweiz
 Nickelodeon Junior (France) 
 Viacom International Media Networks Northern Europe

References

External links
 Official Site
 Nickelodeon (Germany)

Children's television networks
German-language television stations
Germany
Television stations in Berlin
Television channels and stations established in 1995
Television channels and stations disestablished in 1998
Television channels and stations established in 2005
1995 establishments in Germany
1998 disestablishments in Germany
2005 establishments in Germany
Television stations in Austria
Television stations in Switzerland